The Areado Group is a Late Jurassic to Early Cretaceous (Tithonian to Albian; covering approximately 50 million years) geologic group in southeastern Brazil. The group was defined by Cardoso in 1968.

Various fossil theropod tracks have been reported from the aeolic sandstones of the group.

Stratigraphy 
The group contains the following formations from young to old:
 Albian Três Barras Formation - eolian and fluvio-deltaic sandstones
 Aptian Quiricó Formation - lacustrine claystones
 Tithonian-Barremian Abaeté Formation - fluvial conglomerates

See also 
 List of dinosaur-bearing rock formations
 List of stratigraphic units with theropod tracks

References

Bibliography 

 
  
 

Geologic groups of South America
Geologic formations of Brazil
Jurassic System of South America
Late Jurassic South America
Jurassic Brazil
Tithonian Stage
Lower Cretaceous Series of South America
Cretaceous Brazil
Albian Stage
Aptian Stage
Barremian Stage
Hauterivian Stage
Valanginian Stage
Berriasian Stage
Sandstone formations
Conglomerate formations
Shale formations
Aeolian deposits
Deltaic deposits
Fluvial deposits
Lacustrine deposits
Ichnofossiliferous formations
Formations